Scott Taylor (born May 8, 1945) is an American modern pentathlete. He competed at the 1972 Summer Olympics.

References

1945 births
Living people
American male modern pentathletes
Olympic modern pentathletes of the United States
Modern pentathletes at the 1972 Summer Olympics
Sportspeople from Portland, Oregon
20th-century American people